Jaque Fourie (born 4 March 1983) is a South African former professional rugby union player. He was a versatile backline player whose usual position was in the centres. He was a member of the 2007 Rugby World Cup winning team, playing at outside centre for 6 out of 7 matches, including all 80 minutes of the World Cup Final, which South Africa won 15–6.

Career
Fourie made his international debut on 11 October at the 2003 Rugby World Cup at outside centre for the Springboks against Uruguay at Subiaco Oval in Perth, and scored a try on debut. He also played against Georgia during the pool stages, scoring another try. He was a reserve for subsequent World Cup games against Samoa and the All Blacks.

He next played for the Springboks in June 2004, playing on the left wing against Ireland, which South Africa won 26–17. He played a further three times for the Springboks that year; against England at Twickenham, Scotland at Murrayfield in November as well as a match against Argentina at José Amalfitani Stadium in Buenos Aires.

The following year he played in the IRB Rugby Aid Match and was a reserve for the Springboks against Uruguay and France in June, before being included in the Springboks 2005 Tri Nations Series. He played in a further three tests that November. In 2006, he played for the Springboks during the mid year tests and after that he became the first-choice outside centre in the side, usually playing alongside Jean de Villiers (at inside centre).

On 20 October 2007 he won a Rugby World Cup winners' medal when South Africa beat England 15–6 in the 2007 Rugby World Cup final in Paris.

After playing much of 2008 and the 2009 series against the British & Irish Lions off the bench, he was back in the starting team for the 2009 Tri-Nations campaign (won by South Africa). He played his 50th test match for South Africa in a 6–21 loss to Australia in Brisbane on 5 September 2009.

In March 2010 a try scored by Fourie was named as the International Rugby Players Association Try of the Year 2009. The try, scored in the 74th minute of the second Test against the British & Irish Lions in Pretoria in June, sealed a dramatic Series victory for the Springboks.

In March 2017, Fourie was named as part of a new re-branded Western Force team to play in the new World Series Rugby in the lead up to the National Rugby Championship.

International Tries 

Source: scrum.com

References

External links
Stormers profile

Springbok Hall of Fame

1983 births
Living people
Afrikaner people
Alumni of Monument High School
South African rugby union players
South Africa international rugby union players
Stormers players
Western Province (rugby union) players
Golden Lions players
Lions (United Rugby Championship) players
Rugby union centres
Saitama Wild Knights players
Kobelco Kobe Steelers players
Expatriate rugby union players in Japan
South African expatriate rugby union players
South African expatriate sportspeople in Japan
Rugby union players from Gauteng